Eucalyptus jutsonii, commonly known as Jutson's mallee, is a species of mallee that is endemic to Western Australia. It has rough, fibrous bark on its stems, smooth pinkish to greyish brown bark above, glossy green, linear adult leaves, flower buds in groups of seven, cream-coloured flowers and shortened spherical fruit.

Description
It has rough, fibrous grey bark on the stems, smooth pinkish to greyish bark above. Flowering occurs between November and March and the flowers are cream-coloured or white.

Taxonomy and naming
Eucalyptus jutsonii was first formally described in 1919 by Joseph Maiden from a specimen collected from Comet Vale by John Thomas Jutson and the description was published in Journal and Proceedings of the Royal Society of New South Wales. The specific epithet honours the collector of the type specimen.

In 2007, Dean Nicolle and Malcolm French described two subspecies and the names have been accepted by the Australian Plant Census:

Distribution and habitat
Jutson's mallee grows in open shrubland on sand or sandy loam in a restricted area north of Kalgoorlie. Subspecies kobela is only known from two populations east of Morawa.

Conservation status
Subspecies jutsonii is listed as "Priority Four" by the Government of Western Australia Department of Parks and Wildlife, meaning that it is rare or near threatened. Subspecies kobela is classified as "Priority One" by the Government of Western Australia Department of Parks and Wildlife, meaning that it is known from only one or a few locations which are potentially at risk.

See also
List of Eucalyptus species

References

Eucalypts of Western Australia
jutsonii
Myrtales of Australia
Plants described in 1919
Taxa named by Joseph Maiden